Streetlife is the debut album by Australian rock group, Geeza. It was released in mid-1977 by Laser Records / RCA Records and was produced by Mario Millo. The first single, 'Run 'n' Hide', peaked at number 56 on the Australian Kent Music Report Singles Chart, while the second single, 'Song to Warilla', failed to chart.

Background
Geeza was formed in Sydney's western suburbs in late 1973. Their cabaret-style theatrical performances included exploding phone boxes and other extravagant props that were used to win over audiences across Sydney. By September 1975, the band consisted of Gabriel Vendetti on guitar; Lee Martin (aka Martin Adamson) on bass guitar and backing vocals; Allan Fraiel on drums and backing vocals; and Terry Halliday (aka Terry Meaney) on lead vocals. The group started playing some songs in drag, which then led to the writing of the track "Dragon Queen" by Adamson, Venditti, Fraiel and Meaney.

Late in 1976, Geeza began recording their debut album, Streetlife, at Atlantic Studios, which was released in mid-1977. Streetlife spawned two singles, "Run 'n' Hide" and "Song to Warilla", the former peaked at number 56 on the Australian Kent Music Report Singles Chart. The album was produced by Mario Millo (ex-Sebastian Hardie, Windchase) at. "Run 'n' Hide" was written by Martin and the album was issued by Laser Records and RCA Records.

Immediately following the release of Streetlife, Martin departed the band and was replaced by Steve Gronow. Geeza then went on to support the Ted Mulry Gang on their three-month national tour, from April to June 1978. The group worked on a follow up album in 1979 but disbanded before it was finished.

Track listing

Charts

Personnel
Credits according to album notes.

Musicians
 Allan Fraiel – drums, backing vocals
 Terry Halliday – vocals
 Lee Martin – bass guitar, backing vocals
 Gabriel Venditti – guitar

Production
 Brian Bansgrove – cover lighting
 Alex Duyser – recording engineer
 Martin Fabinyi – art direction, art design
 Peter Hood – recording engineer
 Mario Millo – producer at Atlantic Studios, Sydney
 Philip Morris – photography

References

1977 debut albums